St. Elmo's fire—also called Witchfire or Witch's Fire—is a weather phenomenon in which luminous plasma is created by a corona discharge from a rod-like object such as a mast, spire, chimney, or animal horn in an atmospheric electric field. It has also been observed on the leading edges of airplanes, as in the case of British Airways Flight 009. The intensity of the effect, a blue or violet glow around the object, often accompanied by a hissing or buzzing sound, is proportional to the strength of the electric field and therefore noticeable primarily during thunderstorms or volcanic eruptions.

St. Elmo's fire is named after St. Erasmus of Formia (also known as St. Elmo), the patron saint of sailors. The phenomenon, which can warn of an imminent lightning strike, was regarded by sailors with awe and sometimes considered to be a good omen.

Cause
St. Elmo's fire is a reproducible and demonstrable form of plasma. The electric field around the affected object causes ionization of the air molecules, producing a faint glow easily visible in low-light conditions. Conditions that can generate St. Elmo's fire are present during thunderstorms, when high-voltage differentials are present between clouds and the ground underneath. A local electric field of about 100 kV/m is required to begin a discharge in moist air. The magnitude of the electric field depends greatly on the geometry (shape and size) of the object. Sharp points lower the necessary voltage because electric fields are more concentrated in areas of high curvature, so discharges preferentially occur and are more intense at the ends of pointed objects.

The nitrogen and oxygen in the Earth's atmosphere cause St. Elmo's fire to fluoresce with blue or violet light; this is similar to the mechanism that causes neon lights to glow, albeit at a different colour due to the different gas involved.

In 1751, Benjamin Franklin hypothesized that a pointed iron rod would light up at the tip during a lightning storm, similar in appearance to St. Elmo's fire.

In an August 2020 paper, MIT demonstrated that St. Elmo's fire behaves differently in airborne objects versus grounded structures.

In history and culture
In ancient Greece, the appearance of a single instance of St. Elmo's fire was called , literally meaning "torch", with two instances referred to as Castor and Polydeuces, names of the mythological twin brothers of Helen.
After the medieval period, St. Elmo's fire was sometimes associated with the Greek element of fire, such as with one of Paracelsus's elementals, specifically the salamander, or, alternatively, with a similar creature referred to as an acthnici.
Russian sailors also historically documented instances of St. Elmo's fire, known as "Saint Nicholas" or "Saint Peter's lights", also sometimes called St. Helen's or St. Hermes' fire, perhaps through linguistic confusion.
St. Elmo's fire is reported to have been seen during the Siege of Constantinople by the Ottoman Empire in 1453. It was reportedly seen emitting from the top of the Hippodrome. The Byzantines attributed it to a sign that the Christian God would soon come and destroy the conquering Muslim army. According to George Sphrantzes, it disappeared just days before Constantinople fell, ending the Byzantine Empire.
Accounts of Magellan's first circumnavigation of the globe refer to St. Elmo's fire (calling it the body of St. Anselm) being seen around the fleet's ships multiple times off the coast of South America. The sailors saw these as favorable omens.
St Elmo's fire was seen during the 1955 Great Plains tornado outbreak in Kansas and Oklahoma.
Among the phenomena experienced on British Airways Flight 9 on 24 June 1982 were glowing light flashes along the leading edges of the aircraft, including the wings and cockpit windscreen, which were seen by both passengers and crew. While the bright flashes of light shared similarities with St Elmo's fire, the glow experienced was from the impact of ash particles on the leading edges of the aircraft, similar to that seen by operators of sandblasting equipment.
St. Elmo's fire was observed and its optical spectrum recorded during a University of Alaska research flight over the Amazon in 1995 to study sprites.
Ill-fated Air France Flight 447 from Rio de Janeiro–Galeão International Airport to Paris Charles de Gaulle Airport in 2009 is understood to have experienced St. Elmo's fire 23 minutes prior to crashing into the Atlantic Ocean; however, the phenomenon was not a factor in the disaster.
Apoy ni San Elmo – commonly shortened to Santelmo – is a bad omen or a flying spirit in Filipino folklore.

Notable observations

Classical texts
References to St. Elmo's fire can be found in the works of Julius Caesar (De Bello Africo, 47) and Pliny the Elder (Naturalis Historia, book 2, par. 101), Alcaeus frag. 34. Earlier, Xenophanes of Colophon had alluded to the phenomenon.

Zheng He
In 15th-century Ming China, Admiral Zheng He and his associates composed the Liujiagang and Changle inscriptions, the two epitaphs of the treasure voyages, where they made a reference to St. Elmo's fire as a divine omen of Tianfei (天妃), the goddess of sailors and seafarers.

Accounts associated with Magellan and da Gama
Mention of St. Elmo's fire can be found in Antonio Pigafetta's journal of his voyage with Ferdinand Magellan. St. Elmo's fire, also known as "corposants" or "corpusants" from the Portuguese corpo santo ("holy body"), is also described in The Lusiads, the epic account of Vasco da Gama's voyages of discovery.

Robert Burton
Robert Burton wrote of St. Elmo's fire in his Anatomy of Melancholy (1621): "Radzivilius, the Lithuanian duke, calls this apparition Sancti Germani sidus; and saith moreover that he saw the same after in a storm, as he was sailing, 1582, from Alexandria to Rhodes". This refers to the voyage made by Mikołaj Krzysztof "the Orphan" Radziwiłł in 1582–1584.

John Davis
On 9 May 1605, while on the second voyage of John Davis commanded by Sir Edward Michelborne to the East Indies, an unknown writer aboard the Tiger describes the phenomenon: "In the extremity of our storm appeared to us in the night, upon our maine Top-mast head, a flame about the bigness of a great Candle, which the Portugals call Corpo Sancto, holding it a most divine token that when it appeareth the worst is past. As, thanked be God, we had better weather after it".

Pierre Testu-Brissy

Pierre Testu-Brissy was a pioneering French balloonist. On 18 June 1786 he flew for 11 hours and made the first electrical observations as he ascended into thunderclouds. He stated that he drew remarkable discharges from the clouds by means of an iron rod carried in the basket. He also experienced Saint Elmo's fire.<ref name="Ballooning Who's Who"/

William Noah
William Noah, a silversmith convicted in London of stealing 2,000 pounds of lead, while en route to Sydney, New South Wales on the convict transport ship , recorded two such observations in his detailed daily journal.  The first was in the Southern Ocean midway between Cape Town and Sydney and the second was in the Tasman Sea, a day out of Port Jackson:

While the exact nature of these weather phenomena cannot be certain, they appear to be mostly about two observations of St. Elmo's fire with perhaps some ball lightning and even a direct lightning strike to the ship thrown into the mix.

James Braid
On 20 February 1817, during a severe electrical storm, James Braid, surgeon at Lord Hopetoun's mines at Leadhills, Lanarkshire, had an extraordinary experience whilst on horseback:

Weeks earlier, reportedly on 17 January 1817, a luminous snowstorm occurred in Vermont and New Hampshire. Saint Elmo's fire appeared as static discharges on roof peaks, fence posts, and the hats and fingers of people. Thunderstorms prevailed over central New England.

Charles Darwin
Charles Darwin noted the effect while aboard the Beagle. He wrote of the episode in a letter to J. S. Henslow that one night when the Beagle was anchored in the estuary of the Río de la Plata:
He also describes the above night in his book The Voyage of the Beagle:

Richard Henry Dana
In Two Years Before the Mast, Richard Henry Dana, Jr., describes seeing a corposant in the horse latitudes of the northern Atlantic Ocean. However, he may have been talking about ball lightning; as mentioned earlier, it is often erroneously identified as St. Elmo's fire: 

The observation by R. H. Dana of this phenomenon in Two Years Before the Mast is a straightforward description of an extraordinary experience apparently only known to mariners and airline pilots.

Nikola Tesla
Nikola Tesla created St. Elmo's fire in 1899 while testing a Tesla coil at his laboratory in Colorado Springs, Colorado, United States. St. Elmo's fire was seen around the coil and was said to have lit up the wings of butterflies with blue halos as they flew around.

Mark Heald
A minute before the crash of the Luftschiffbau Zeppelin's LZ 129 Hindenburg on 6 May 1937, Professor Mark Heald (1892–1971) of Princeton saw St. Elmo's Fire flickering along the airship's back. Standing outside the main gate to the Naval Air Station, he watched, together with his wife and son, as the airship approached the mast and dropped her bow lines. A minute thereafter, by Heald's estimation, he first noticed a dim "blue flame" flickering along the backbone girder about one-quarter the length abaft the bow to the tail. There was time for him to remark to his wife, "Oh, heavens, the thing is afire," for her to reply, "Where?" and for him to answer, "Up along the top ridge" – before there was a big burst of flaming hydrogen from a point he estimated to be about one-third the ship's length from the stern.

William L. Laurence
St. Elmo's fire was reported by The New York Times reporter William L. Laurence on August 9, 1945, as he was aboard Bockscar on the way to Nagasaki.

In popular culture

In literature 

One of the earliest references to the phenomenon appears in Alcaeus's Fragment 34a about the Dioscuri, or Castor and Pollux. It is also referenced in Homeric Hymn 33 to the Dioscuri who were from Homeric times associated with it. Whether the Homeric Hymn antedates the Alcaeus fragment is unknown.

The phenomenon appears to be described first in the Gesta Herwardi, written around 1100 and concerning an event of the 1070s. However, one of the earliest direct references to St. Elmo's fire made in fiction can be found in Ludovico Ariosto's epic poem Orlando Furioso (1516). It is located in the 17th canto (19th in the revised edition of 1532) after a storm has punished the ship of Marfisa, Astolfo, Aquilant, Grifon, and others, for three straight days, and is positively associated with hope:

In William Shakespeare's The Tempest (c. 1623), Act I, Scene II, St. Elmo's fire acquires a more negative association, appearing as evidence of the tempest inflicted by Ariel according to the command of Prospero:

The fires are also mentioned as "death fires" in Samuel Taylor Coleridge's The Rime of the Ancient Mariner:

Later in the 18th and 19th centuries, literature associated St. Elmo's fire with a bad omen or divine judgment, coinciding with the growing conventions of Romanticism and the Gothic novel. For example, in Ann Radcliffe's The Mysteries of Udolpho (1794), during a thunderstorm above the ramparts of the castle:

In the 1864 novel Journey to the Center of the Earth by Jules Verne, the author describes the fire occurring while sailing during a subterranean electrical storm (chapter 35, page 191):

In Herman Melville's novel Moby-Dick, Starbuck points out "corpusants" during a thunder storm in the Japanese sea in chapter 119, "The Candles".

St. Elmo's fire makes an appearance in The Adventures of Tintin comic, Tintin in Tibet, by Hergé. Tintin recognizes the phenomenon on Captain Haddock's ice-axe.

The phenomenon appears in the first stanza of Robert Hayden's poem "The Ballad of Nat Turner"; it is also referred to with the term "corposant" in the first section of his long poem "Middle Passage".

In Kurt Vonnegut's Slaughterhouse-Five, Billy Pilgrim sees the phenomenon on soldiers' helmets and on rooftops. Vonnegut's The Sirens of Titan also notes the phenomenon affecting Winston Niles Rumfoord's dog, Kazak, the Hound of Space, in conjunction with solar disturbances of the chrono-synclastic infundibulum.

In Robert Aickman's story "Niemandswasser" (1975), the protagonist, Prince Albrecht von Allendorf, is "known as Elmo to his associates, because of the fire which to them emanated from him". "There was an inspirational force in Elmo of which the sensitive soon became aware, and which had led to his Spottname or nickname."

In On the Banks of Plum Creek by Laura Ingalls Wilder, St. Elmo's fire is seen by the girls and Ma during one of the blizzards. It was described as coming down the stove pipe and rolling across the floor following Ma's knitting needles; it did not burn the floor (pages 309–310).  The phenomenon as described, however, is more similar to ball lightning.

In Voyager, the third major novel in Diana Gabaldon's popular Outlander series, the primary characters experience St. Elmo's fire while lost at sea in a thunderstorm between Hispaniola and coastal Georgia.

St. Elmo's fire is also mentioned in the novel, Castaways of the Flying Dutchman by Brian Jacques.

In television 
On the children's television series The Mysterious Cities of Gold (1982), episode four shows St. Elmo's fire affecting the ship as it sailed past the Strait of Magellan. The real-life footage at the end of the episode has snippets of an interview with Japanese sailor Fukunari Imada, whose comments were translated to: "Although I've never seen St. Elmo's fire, I'd certainly like to. It was often considered a bad omen, as it played havoc with compasses and equipment". The TV series also referred to St. Elmo's fire as being a bad omen during the cartoon. The footage was captured as part of his winning solo yacht race in 1981.

On the American television series Rawhide, in a 1959 episode titled "Incident of the Blue Fire", cattle drovers on a stormy night see St. Elmo's fire glowing on the horns of their steers, which the men regard as a deadly omen.  St. Elmo's fire is also referenced in a 1965 episode of Bonanza in which religious pilgrims staying on the Cartwright property believe an experience with St. Elmo's fire is the work of Satan.

On the Netflix original animated series Trese (2021), the Santelmo (St. Elmo's Fire) is one of the protagonist's, Alexandra Trese's, allies whom she contacts using her old Nokia phone, dialing the date of the Great Binondo fire, 0003231870.

In film

In Moby Dick (1956), St. Elmo's fire stops Captain Ahab from killing Starbuck.
In The Last Sunset (1961), outlaw/cowhand Brendan "Bren" O'Malley (Kirk Douglas) rides in from the herd and leads the recently widowed Belle Breckenridge (Dorothy Malone) to an overview of the cattle. As he takes the rifle from her, he proclaims, "Something out there, you could live five lifetimes, and never see again," the audience is then shown a shot of the cattle with a blue or violet glow coming from their horns. "Look. St. Elmo's fire. Never seen it except on ships," O'Malley says as Belle says, "I've never seen it anywhere. What is it?"  Trying to win her back, he says, "Well, a star fell and smashed and scattered its glow all over the place."
In St. Elmo's Fire (1985), Rob Lowe's character Billy Hicks erroneously claims that the phenomenon is "not even a real thing."
In the Western miniseries Lonesome Dove (1989-1990), lightning strikes a herd of cattle during a storm, causing their horns to glow blue.
In Lars von Trier's 2011 film Melancholia, the phenomenon features in the opening sequence and later in the film as the rogue planet Melancholia approaches Earth for an impact event.
In Robert Eggers's 2019 horror film The Lighthouse, it appears in reference to the mysterious salvation that lighthouse keeper Thomas Wake (Willem Dafoe) is hiding from Ephraim Winslow (Robert Pattinson) inside the Fresnel lens of the lantern.

In music
Brian Eno's third studio album Another Green World (1975) contains a song titled "St. Elmo's Fire" in which guesting King Crimson guitarist Robert Fripp (credited with playing "Wimshurst guitar" in the liner notes) improvises a lightning-fast solo that would imitate an electrical charge between two poles on a Wimshurst high-voltage generator.

"St. Elmo's Fire (Man in Motion)" is a song recorded by John Parr. It hit number one on the Billboard Hot 100 on September 7, 1985, remaining there for two weeks. It was the main theme for Joel Schumacher's 1985 film St. Elmo's Fire.

"St. Elmo's Fire" by Michael Franks.

The Sammarinese entry for the 2017 Eurovision Song Contest in Kyiv “Spirit of the Night” contains references to St. Elmo’s Fire.

See also
Earthquake light
Foo fighter, WWII UFO observations
Hessdalen lights
List of plasma physics articles
Naga fireball, rising from Mekong River
Triboelectric effect
Will-o'-the-wisp
Ball lightning

Notes

References

External links

St. Elmo's fire photographed on the flight deck of an airliner

Atmospheric ghost lights
Electrical phenomena
Light sources